Yahia Khaled Mahmoud Fathy Omar (born 9 September 1997) is an Egyptian handball player who plays for Telekom Veszprém and the Egyptian national team.

He participated in the World Men's Handball Championship in 2017, 2019 and 2021.

Individual awards
All-Star Right back of the Olympic Games: 2020
 SEHA League All-Star Team Best Right Back: 2020–21
 All-Star Right back of the 2022 African Championship
 Most Valuable Player (MVP) of the 2022 African Championship

References

1997 births
Living people
Egyptian male handball players
Olympic handball players of Egypt
Handball players at the 2020 Summer Olympics
Sportspeople from Giza
Egyptian expatriate sportspeople in Hungary
Expatriate handball players
21st-century Egyptian people